Barwick is a city divided by the county line between Brooks and Thomas counties, Georgia, United States. It is part of the Valdosta, Georgia Metropolitan Statistical Area. As of the 2020 census, the city had a population of 363.

History
Barwick had its start in the early 1890s when the railroad was extended to that point. A post office has been in operation at Barwick since 1894. The community was named after R. H. Barwick, a Primitive Baptist leader. Barwick was incorporated by the Georgia General Assembly as a town in 1903.

Geography
Barwick is located at  (30.8921, −83.7384).

Demographics

As of the census of 2000, there were 444 people, 181 households, and 110 families residing in the town. The racial makeup of the town was 47.07% White, 49.77% African American, 0.90% Asian, 1.80% from other races, and 0.45% from two or more races. Hispanic or Latino of any race were 3.38% of the population.

There were 181 households, out of which 24.9% had children under the age of 18 living with them, 40.9% were married couples living together, 16.0% had a female householder with no husband present, and 39.2% were non-families. 35.9% of all households were made up of individuals, and 19.9% had someone living alone who was 65 years of age or older.  The average household size was 2.45 and the average family size was 3.25.

In the town the population was spread out, with 29.3% under the age of 18, 8.8% from 18 to 24, 22.3% from 25 to 44, 22.7% from 45 to 64, and 16.9% who were 65 years of age or older.  The median age was 35 years. For every 100 females, there were 90.6 males.  For every 100 females age 18 and over, there were 81.5 males.

The median income for a household in the town was $19,000, and the median income for a family was $21,250. Males had a median income of $26,806 versus $20,000 for females. The per capita income for the town was $11,091.  About 41.7% of families and 42.3% of the population were below the poverty line, including 63.0% of those under age 18 and 24.6% of those age 65 or over.

References

External links
City of Barwick official website

Cities in Brooks County, Georgia
Cities in Thomas County, Georgia
Cities in Georgia (U.S. state)
Cities in the Valdosta metropolitan area